is a Japanese singer and actress. Under her former stage name , Sakai released her first single,  on February 5, 1987, nine days short of her sixteenth birthday. Over 40,000 copies of the single were sold. She is particularly popular in Hong Kong and Taiwan. Her best-selling single to date is "Aoi Usagi".

In August 2009, Sakai was arrested on suspicion of possession and abuse of drugs and sentenced to probation for three years. She divorced her husband  after the incident and temporarily stayed away from the media circle. After her probation ended, she began rehearsals for the theater, and signed on with Office Nigun Niiba, as a first step towards returning to the media community. On May 1, 2021, she left Office Nigun Niiba and joined Smile.

Biography
Noriko Sakai was born in Fukuoka, Fukuoka Prefecture, Japan. She made her debut as an idol singer in 1986.

Sakai released her first single,  on February 5, 1987, nine days short of her sixteenth birthday. Over 40,000 copies of the single were sold. In the early years of her career, she used the nickname , although around the mid-1990s she started to distance herself from it.

She ventured overseas in the 1990s to Taiwan to shoot VITALON P beverage commercials, as well as holding concerts which received praise.

Sakai returned to the public attention after 1993, where she received recognition for her acting in Hitotsu Yane no Shita as Kashiwagi Koyuki. In 1995, she acted in Hoshi no Kinka (Heaven's Coins) as Aya Kuramoto, also singing the theme song  which became her best selling album to date.

By the end of 1998 she organized the Asian concert tours throughout Taiwan, mainland China, Singapore, South Korea, Malaysia, Indonesia, Thailand and other countries in the regions.

Personal life
She and Yūichi have one son, born on July 17, 1999.

Return to the entertainment industry
In January 2000, after the birth of her son, Sakai made a comeback to showbiz, and gradually took on roles in movies, drama and advertising. Sakai's popularity in Japan is not outstanding, but she has considerable supporters in Hong Kong, Taiwan and mainland China.

Drug scandal 
Sakai re-emerged in the headlines for a drug scandal on August 2, 2009, when Sakai's husband, Yūichi Takasō allegedly inhaled a small amount of stimulant drugs in a public lavatory, at a park in Tokyo's Minato Ward. The next day, Takasō's car, parked on a street in Tokyo's Shibuya Ward, was searched. In the car, 0.817 grams of stimulant drugs were found. On August 4, 2009, Takasō was stopped by Tokyo Metropolitan Police while walking in public in Shibuya. When Takasō was subjected to a body search, stimulant drugs were reportedly found in his underwear. Takasō was immediately placed under arrest. Sakai was summoned to the scene of the arrest. She was asked to go to the police station for further questions and to submit to a urine test. Instead, she told the police she had to pick her 10-year-old son up, and that she would go to the police station later that day. Sakai later disappeared with her son.

While Takasō was being questioned at the police department, he reportedly told the police he and Sakai were involved in drugs. As early as ten days prior to his arrest, the two of them used drugs while on a family trip to Amami Ōshima in Kagoshima Prefecture. At the time of Takasō's arrest, Sakai was living in her own apartment in Tokyo. While Sakai was away, the police searched Sakai's home, and reportedly found 0.008 grams of stimulant drugs, carefully wrapped in aluminum foil. An inhaler among the drugs was discovered to have Sakai's DNA. As a result, a warrant was issued for her arrest. On August 5, 2009, Sakai dropped her son off with an unnamed friend, purchased some underwear and other necessities from a store, and then disappeared.

Attempting to track Sakai down by cell phone, the police reported that her cell phone lost signal within the area of Yamanashi Prefecture, about 60 miles (100 kilometers) west of Tokyo. Sakai later claimed that the cell phone was damaged, and that she threw the phone away. The police believed that the cell phone may have contained information leading to the source of the stimulant drugs.

On August 7, 2009, Sakai turned herself in to the authorities, and then was placed under arrest. The official charge against Sakai was "suspicion of possessing stimulant drugs," according to a Tokyo police official. She admitted to the drugs being in her apartment, but did not admit to taking the drugs herself. She also said she kept the drugs in foil "to use them later."

On August 17, 2009, a beach house in Katsuura, Chiba was also searched. A frequent location for both Sakai and Takasō the past five years, 0.097 grams of amphetamines and paraphernalia were found in the house. On August 21, 2009, after admitting to the drugs found in the beach house, Takasō was served with a second charge for possession of stimulant drugs.

Drug testing and indictment 
On August 9, 2009 – two days after Sakai's arrest, a urine test result came up negative. Light use of methamphetamine can only be detected in a urine test within one to four days after use. On August 19, 2009, investigators announced that Sakai's hair tested positive for the stimulant drug, although the results were weak. Before Sakai was caught, she reportedly dyed and cut her hair; both practices would affect the testing results. Because of the positive result in the hair test, Sakai's jail time was extended another nine days – until August 28, 2009.

On the final day of Sakai's detention, prosecutors officially indicted Sakai for alleged amphetamine possession, based on the evidence collected by the police. The fact that the drugs were carefully wrapped for later use was a deciding factor in the verdict. On September 10, 2009, an additional charge of stimulant drug use was added. Sakai allegedly used amphetamines at a hotel during her Kagoshima Prefecture visit with her husband and son.

Sakai was released from jail after posting bail on September 17, 2009. Accompanied by her attorney, and with Sun Music Vice President Masahisa Aizawa in attendance, she apologized to the public during a press conference. "My weakness caused me to give in to illegal drugs and caused grief to many people. I pledge to repent and atone for this crime for the rest of my life," she said. Sakai was checked into a hospital to overcome her drug habit, and asked for restraint from the media during her recovery.

Sakai's first court date was held on October 26, 2009 – drawing a crowd of 6,600 people outside of a Tokyo courthouse. Sakai pleaded guilty to drug use. Prosecutors suggested eighteen months in prison for Sakai, but on November 9, 2009, the court delayed the jail term to November 9, 2012, as long as she stays crime-free. Sakai attended the University of Creation; Art, Music & Social Work in Takasaki, Gunma, where she received her degree in welfare and nursing care in March 2013.

Reactions 
The drug scandal cost Sakai billions of yen in canceled contracts and other endeavors she was involved in prior. On August 6, 2009, car manufacturer Toyota reportedly stopped showing a commercial, featuring Sakai, on its web site. Sakai's clothing line "PP rikorino", consisting of over 150 items were pulled from stores throughout Japan.

During the first week of the scandal, Apple Inc's iTunes Store rated Sakai's 1995 song "Aoi Usagi" the number one downloaded song, based on an eleven-day period. Other Sakai songs among the top 100 downloads include Kagami no Doresu (17th) and Sekaijū no Dare Yori Kitto (18th). However, on August 9, 2009, Victor Entertainment, the distributor of Sakai's works, withdrew Sakai's CDs from stores, and suspended downloads of her songs. Online stores such as Amazon Japan still sell Sakai's CDs and DVDs, despite increasing the selling prices as a result of Victor's move.

Immediately after the indictment announcement, Sun Music, the talent agency who has represented Sakai since 1986, suspended her contract and removed her official website from its server. The agency's president Masahisa Aizawa said, "We apologize from the bottom of our hearts for the alleged misdeeds of Ms. Sakai." Soon after Aizawa's announcement, he was demoted to vice-president. Chairman Hideyoshi Aizawa removed himself from the position, and is now an adviser to Sun Music, with no right to represent the firm.

In the aftermath of the scandal, Sakai divorced her husband Takasō on July 31, 2010.

Second return to the entertainment industry 
In April 2011, Sakai participated in a tour around Beijing to educate the hazards of drug addiction. She claimed that she would temporarily set aside her entertainment career to partake in charity organizations.

At a news conference on November 24, 2012, Sakai announced her return to the entertainment industry, after finishing her suspended sentence that ended earlier Friday. Sakai also signed on with talent agency Office Nigun Niiba. She returned to the stage in December 2012 as the main character in a story about the Sengoku period, ending December 25, 2012. In all, 7,500 people attended the stage performance during the ten-day period.

In October 2021, Sakai re-recorded "Aoi Usagi" and placed an NFT of it and promo photos on auction to promote the fourth season of the drama series Producer K, which marked her first drama appearance in eight years.

Discography

Video 
 Guanbare CDV Special (mini laser disc)

Filmography

Film
 Pikachu and Pichu, 2000
 Ju-on: The Grudge 2, 2003
 Yogen, 2004
 SS, 2008
 Utsusemi no Mori, 2021

Television dramas 
 Tobu ga Gotoku as Saigō Koto, NHK 1990
 Hitotsu Yane no Shita as Kashiwagi Koyuki, Fuji TV 1993
 Longing For The Old You, NTV 1994
 Watashi, Mikata Desu, TBS 1995
 Hoshi no Kinka (Heaven's Coins) as Aya Kuramoto, NTV 1995
 Zoku Hoshi no Kinka (Heaven's Coins 2) as Aya Kuramoto, NTV 1996
 Hitotsu Yane no Shita 2 as Koyuki Kashiwagi, Fuji TV 1997
 Seija no Koushin, TBS 1999
 Toi Shinseki Chikaku no Tanin, NHK 1999
 Tenshi ga Kieta Machi, NTV 2000
 Honke no Yome, NTV 2001
 Toshiie and Matsu as One, NHK 2002
 Mukodono 2003, Fuji TV 2003
 Fight as Kido Ayako, NHK 2005
 Marumaru Chibi Maruko-chan as Okaasan, Fuji TV 2007

Kōhaku Uta Gassen appearances

Photo books 
 Let's Nori-P
 Shuffle Heart
 Blue Pearl
 Aquarius
 Zephoros
 In Europe
 In Greece
 Comme Le Cinema
 Shinin Run
 Orange Hotel
 Naturelle
 Fizz

Other
  (video game for the PC Engine CD add-on)

References

External links

 
  (Victor Entertainment)
 
 
 Noriko Sakai at Oricon
 Noriko Sakai at Idol.ne.jp
 
 

1971 births
Living people
Horikoshi High School alumni
People from Fukuoka
Japanese women pop singers
Japanese female idols
People of Shōwa-period Japan
Japanese people convicted of drug offenses
Mandarin-language singers of Japan
English-language singers from Japan
Victor Entertainment artists
Musicians from Fukuoka Prefecture
20th-century Japanese actresses
21st-century Japanese actresses
20th-century Japanese women singers
20th-century Japanese singers
21st-century Japanese women singers
21st-century Japanese singers